Montezuma Creek is a tributary of the San Juan River.

Location

See also
List of rivers of Utah

References

Rivers of Utah
Rivers of San Juan County, Utah
Tributaries of the Colorado River in Utah